Events in the year 1996 in Germany.

Incumbents
President – Roman Herzog 
Chancellor – Helmut Kohl

Events

 Deutsche Telekom is privatized. 
15–26 February – 46th Berlin International Film Festival
1 March – Germany in the Eurovision Song Contest 1996
11 April – Düsseldorf Airport fire
28 June – Osnabrück mortar attack
1 October – Jakub Fiszman is abducted.

Elections

 Rhineland-Palatinate state election, 1996

Births 
2 May – Lisa Mayer, athlete
13 August – Antonia Lottner, tennis player
11 November – Gianluca Gaudino, footballer
21 November – Gina Lückenkemper, athlete

Deaths
1 January – Arthur Rudolph, German rocket engineer (born 1906)
6 January – Kurt Schmücker, German politician (born 1919)
9 February – Adolf Galland, German general (born 1912)
23 February – Helmut Schön, German football player and manager (born 1915)
26 February – Georg Henneberg, German physician (born 1908)
4 March – Gerhard Schaffran, German bishop of Roman Catholic Church (born 1912)
15 March – Wolfgang Koeppen, German writer (born 1906)
28 March – Hans Blumenberg, philosopher and intellectual historian (born 1920)
3 May – Hermann Kesten, German author (born 1900)
11 June – Brigitte Helm, German actress (born 1906)
8 July – Albrecht, Duke of Bavaria, German nobleman (born 1905)
14 August – Camilla Horn, German actress (born 1903)
15 August – Albert Osswald, German politician (born 1919)
20 August – Rio Reiser, singer (born 1950)
19 September – Helmut Heißenbüttel, German writer (born 1921)
21 September
Franz Pfnür, German alpine skier (born 1908)
Claus Holm, German actor (born 1918)
13 October – Henri Nannen, German journalist (born 1913)
8 November – Johannes Frömming, German harness racing driver (born 1910)
29 December – Wolfgang Pietzsch, German chess grand master (born 1930)

See also
1996 in German television

References

 
Years of the 20th century in Germany
1990s in Germany
Germany
Germany